Julio Polet (born 10 November 1898, date of death unknown) was an Argentine cyclist. He competed in four events at the 1924 Summer Olympics.

References

External links
 

1898 births
Year of death missing
Argentine male cyclists
Olympic cyclists of Argentina
Cyclists at the 1924 Summer Olympics
Place of birth missing
20th-century Argentine people